The Bulgarian People's Union was a centre-right electoral alliance in Bulgaria. It contested only one legislative election: that on 25 June 2005. It won 5.7% of the popular vote and 13 out of 240 seats. The Union was composed by the Bulgarian Agrarian People's Union-People's Union, the IMRO – Bulgarian National Movement and the Union of Free Democrats (Съюз на свободните демократи).

In 2006 several corruption scandals were connected to the leader of BPU – the former mayor of capital city of Sofia – Stefan Sofiyanski. Political surveys in 2006 showed seriously decreasing support for the BPU.

The alliance disbanded later that year.

References

Agrarian parties in Bulgaria
Conservative parties in Bulgaria
Defunct political party alliances in Bulgaria
Nationalist parties in Bulgaria